The Cretan Lie refers to an episode within the Odyssey in which Odysseus relays a fabricated story of his exploits against Egypt to the loyal swine herd, Eumaeus. This story has been subjected to much inquiry in the field of the history and archaeology of the end of the Late Bronze Age.

Synopsis

In his story, Odysseus is unable to return to Crete following the Trojan War and, by divine provocation, is forced to launch an expedition against Egyptians. Odysseus's fleet is routed due to Zeus's wrath but the Egyptian king takes pity on Odysseus. Odysseus amasses wealth in Egypt but later loses it in a ship wreck.
But a spirit in me urged, 'Set sail for Egypt—
fit out ships, take crews of seasoned heroes!'
Nine I fitted out, the men joined up at once
and then six days my shipmates feasted well
But swept away by their own reckless fury, the crew went berserk—
they promptly began to plunder the lush Egyptian farms,
dragged off the women and children, killed the men.
Outcries reached the city in no time—stirred by shouts

- Homer, Odyssey Book XIV

Historical significance

The significance of this story is the topic of much scholarly analysis particularly with its close parallels to the story of the Sea Peoples and the Battle of the Nile as recorded at the mortuary temple of Ramses III at Medinet Habu. Likewise, Ramses II's adoption of invading Sherden into his bodyguard reflects Odysseus's residence and enrichment in Egypt. It is then speculated that Odysseus's lie reflected some historical fact of the Late Bronze Age Collapse from the oral traditions of the Mycenean Greeks.

References 

Odyssey
Greek mythology
Archaeology